Artsyom Alyaksandravich Radzkow (born 26 August 1985) is a Belarusian football coach and former player.

Career
He was a member of Belarus national football team. He ended his playing in late 2015 after being unable to fully recover from a series of injuries.

Honours
BATE Borisov
Belarusian Premier League champion: 2006, 2007, 2009, 2010, 2011, 2012, 2013
Belarusian Cup winner: 2005–06, 2009–10
Belarusian Super Cup winner: 2010, 2011, 2013

External links
 
 

1985 births
Living people
People from Mogilev
Sportspeople from Mogilev Region
Belarusian footballers
Association football defenders
Belarus international footballers
Belarusian expatriate footballers
Expatriate footballers in Russia
Expatriate footballers in Turkey
FC Khimki players
FC BATE Borisov players
FC Torpedo-BelAZ Zhodino players
Russian Premier League players
FC Dnepr Mogilev players
FC Akhmat Grozny players
Süper Lig players
Gençlerbirliği S.K. footballers
Belarusian football managers
FC Isloch Minsk Raion managers